Aethes albogrisea is a species of moth of the family Tortricidae. It was described by Razowski and Wojtusiak in 2009. It is found in Morona-Santiago Province, Ecuador.

The ground colour of the forewings is white with greyish strigulation (fine streaks) and spots. The costa is dark grey up to the middle and the markings are grey with darker marks. The hindwings are whitish, but become grey on the periphery.

Etymology
The species name refers to the colouration of the forewings and is derived from Latin alba (meaning white) and grisea (meaning grey).

References

Moths described in 2009
albogrisea
Taxa named by Józef Razowski
Moths of South America
Endemic fauna of Ecuador